Love You to Bits is the seventh studio album by No-Man.

Released as the first album for 11 years after Schoolyard Ghosts (2008), the album consists of two five-part song cycles and has been described as, "Chronicling the aftermath of a relationship from different perspectives". Within the songs, each part is called a "bit" or a "piece". Musically, the album represents a return to the more electronic, beat-driven sound of the band's earliest albums, while also incorporating conceptual and organic elements that echo approaches heard on the band's later releases.

"Love You to Bits" (Bit 1) was released as a single in early November 2019, along with a 13-minute non-album instrumental B-side entitled "Love You to Shreds (Shreds 1–3)".

Produced, written and performed by No-Man and mixed by Bruno Ellingham, former Miles Davis keyboard player Adam Holzman, drummer Ash Soan, The Dave Desmond Brass Quintet, No-Man live bassist Pete Morgan and Slovak Jazz guitarist David Kollar guest.

Critical reception

The album received very favourable reviews in publications as diverse as Classic Pop, Classic Rock, Record Collector, Louder Than War, Prog, Electronic Sound and MOJO in the UK, Eclipsed and Rolling Stone in Germany, Classic Rock and Prog in Italy, Metal Hammer and Teraz Rock in Poland, and more. It holds an average score of 3.6/5 in Sputnikmusic website based on ratings from 31 users.

Writing for US site Under the Radar, Stephen Humphries gave the album eight out of 10 stars.  Raul Stanciu from Sputnikmusic gave the album 3.8 out of 5 stars and defined it as a "polarizing record" while remarking "the piece can be better appreciated when digested as a whole".

Physical Formats
The album is available on CD in a digipack with booklet and as a black 180g vinyl edition.

Limited edition blue vinyl and cassette versions were available via the band's store and sold out during the pre-release period.

Track listing

Charts

References

No-Man albums
2019 albums